Harry Havelock Henderson (October 12, 1904 – May 5, 1976) was an American boxer who competed in the 1928 Summer Olympics. He was born in Weston, Massachusetts and died in Virginia Beach, Virginia. In 1928 he was eliminated in the quarter-finals of the middleweight class after losing his fight to the upcoming bronze medalist Jan Heřmánek.

1928 Olympic results
Below is the record of Harry Henderson, an American middleweight boxer who competed at the 1928 Amsterdam Olympics:

 Round of 32: bye
 Round of 16: defeated Cesar Campuzan (Spain) on points
 Quarterfinal: lost to Jan Heřmánek (Czechosolvakia) on points

References

1904 births
1976 deaths
Boxers from Massachusetts
Middleweight boxers
Olympic boxers of the United States
Boxers at the 1928 Summer Olympics
People from Weston, Massachusetts
American male boxers
Sportspeople from Middlesex County, Massachusetts